Hung Liang-chuan or Uya Pawan is a Taiwanese politician. He served as the Deputy Minister of the Council of Indigenous Peoples of the Executive Yuan starting in May 2012.

Education
Hung obtained his bachelor's degree in economics from National Taiwan University in 1973.

Early political life
Prior to his appointment as Deputy Minister of the Council of Indigenous Peoples, Hung was the director of the Department of Economic and Public Construction of the same council.

See also
 Taiwanese aborigines

References

Living people
Political office-holders in the Republic of China on Taiwan
National Taiwan University alumni
Year of birth missing (living people)